The 11th Pan American Games were held in Havana, Cuba from August 2 to August 18, 1991.

Events

See also
 Equestrian at the 1992 Summer Olympics

References 

  .
 

Events at the 1991 Pan American Games
1991
1991 in equestrian
Equestrian sports competitions in Cuba